Dong Cheng may refer to:

Dong Cheng (Han Dynasty) (died 200), general of the Chinese Han Dynasty
Dong Cheng (boxer) (born 1986), Chinese female boxer

See also
Dongcheng (disambiguation)